Rebuild Foundation is a non-profit organization dedicated to transforming buildings and neighborhoods in South Side Chicago, sustaining cultural development as well as celebrating art. The Rebuild Foundation was founded in 2009 by Theaster Gates, a social practice installation artist. The Foundation is currently composed of seven projects.

History 
In 2009, Theaster Gates founded Rebuild Foundation, aiming to collaborate with cities to transform vacant buildings into aesthetic and economical living and cultural spaces. The Rebuild Foundation is composed of seven different projects: Dorchester Industries, Dorchester Art + Housing Collaborative, Stony Island Arts Bank, Black Cinema House, Black Artists Retreat, Archive House, and Listening House. Gates combined urban planning and art to give inner-city neighborhoods in Chicago a second life; while preserving their history. Through the various projects Rebuild offers, Gates hires and teaches neighborhoods to work in different construction trades.

Stony Island Arts Bank 

The Stony Island Arts Trust and Savings Bank Building was a community bank in South Shore Chicago that was shut down in the 1980s. In October 2015, Theaster Gates bought the building from the City of Chicago for $1. The building was transformed by the Rebuild Foundation and designer William Gibbens Uffendell. Gates raised funding for the project by selling marble blocks as pieces of art and hosting a gala at the bank. Stony Island Arts Bank is a place dedicated to rehabilitating the neighborhood's culture and provides a place for the community to come and express themselves and their heritage through art, cinema, exhibitions, and readings and dedicates their attention to educating a community primarily about African American culture, art, and architecture. The Stony Island Arts Bank holds different exhibits every month and preserves many artifacts important to Chicago's music history. In 2014, Rebuild Foundation received an investment contribution from JP Morgan Chase worth $300,000. Rebuild Foundation directed the investment to the renovation of St. Laurence School in Chicago, which is based in the Stony Island Arts Bank. In 2016, Stony Island Arts Bank received the Richard H. Driehaus Foundation Preservation Award. This award recognizes stories of salvaging buildings throughout the state, displaying how restoration has a positive impact on communities, the environment and residents of the state.

Stony Island Arts Bank Collections 
 Edward J. Williams "negrobilia" Collection
Frankie Knuckles Vinyl Record Collection
Johnson Publishing Archive + Collections
 University of Chicago Glass Lantern Slides
Tamir Rice Gazebo Memorial (see #Controversy below)

Dorchester Industries 

Dorchester Industries was founded on November 1, 2016. It's an industrial production, led by artists, that creates spaces, furniture, and pieces of art using materials given by the City of Chicago. It also teaches young artists and members of underdeveloped neighborhoods how to use materials such as clay and wood and techniques like kiln firing and glazing. It provides training that encourages members to pursue an education for a professional career.

Programs 
Dorchester Industries Apprentice Program - South Side residents are given the opportunity to work along with local tradespeople, such as landscapers, contractors, masons, etc. and with the Rebuild Foundation's Artist in Residence to create their own line of art works and then hold the benefit to auction off their pieces.

Dorchester Art + Housing Collaborative 

Dorchester Art + Housing Collaborative is composed of the old Dante Harper Housing Project that now consists of 32 mixed-income rental units that are 2-3 bedrooms. Brinshore Development, Rebuild Foundation and Rebuild Foundation's founder, Theaster Gates, worked with Landon Bone Baker Architects to create a one of a kind development that brings public housing individuals interested in art and current practicing artists together in a combined space. All of the buildings making up the Dorchester Art + Housing Collaborative keep the same modern design as the original layout. The only difference is the use of an Arts Center which consists of four former townhomes in the middle of the development. The Arts Center gives an open space for those of this community to come together and share work, express themselves, and work together. The artists in the residence do voluntary art training and classes for those of the low-income families in the development. The Rebuild Foundation also coordinates some art programs with organizations like Little Black Pearl, a non-profit organization that works primarily in black communities on Chicago's South Side that works with urban youth to create a safe environment, positive role models, and provides rigorous programs and skill development activities and opportunities. Rebuild Foundation has also created programs with Hyde Park Arts Center, which is an organization that works with contemporary artists residing in Chicago that work with creating a space for artists to showcase their work, create ideas, impact social change, and create networking, for those living in the Dorchester Art + Housing Collaborative.

The 32 mixed income housing units consist of 12 rental units set aside for public housing residents, 11 offered as affordable rentals, and 9 at market rates.

Awards 
Awards received by The Rebuild Foundation include: The 2015 Urban Land Institute's Vision Award for Arts and Community, the 2015 Landmarks Illinois Richard H. Driehaus Foundation Preservation Project of the Year Award for adaptive reuse, the 2016 Merit Award from the Illinois Chapter of the American Society of Landscape Architects, and the 2016 Creating Community Connection Award of the AIA/HUD Secretary's Awards.

Black Cinema House 

The Black Cinema House is located on the South Side of Chicago and its purpose is to screen and discuss films made by the African American community. They opened in October 2012 and has become a place that anyone can go to learn, discuss and understand black cinema. Michael W. Phillips Jr., a long-time film programmer is the director at The Black Cinema house and Amir George, a filmmaker and curator, is the Programmer in Residence.

History 
The Black Cinema House was created from an abandoned building in the Dorchester neighborhood of Chicago's South Side and took about a year to construct. The other two are The Listening House and The Archive House.

Programs 
The BCH offers a video production class to the fifth graders at the South Shore Fine-Arts Academy in collaboration with the Community TV Network, a non-profit organization that focuses on youth and digital media. The BCH also collaborated with Kartemquin to produce a screening and discussion of three films focusing on race in Chicago called "Chicago: Segregated City". Located at Chicago Public Library, greater Grand Crossing Branch, 1000 E 73rd St.

Black Artists Retreat 

Black Artists Retreat (BAR) was founded by Theaster Gates and Eliza Myrie, a Chicago-based artist, with the goal of creating time and space for artists to be together. Gates' goal to gather was matched with Myrie's goal of motivating dialogue among artists of color. Held annually, artists are invited to think, learn, exchange and socialize. This artist-led initiative is guided by the tenets of fellowship, rejuvenation, and intellectual rigor. The Retreat is held annually in Chicago, where it was originated. This two-day event includes roller skating, music and performances, as well as art installations. The Retreat explores how artists, performers, curators, historians and others play, pray, worship, commune, entertain, interrupt, celebrate, heal, mourn and invite unity. 2019 was the first year the Retreat was held outside of Gates' native town, the Retreat was held in New York, at the Park Avenue Armory's Drill Hall. Gates rehabbed the hall with the Park Avenue Armory Conservancy. BAR provides opportunities for artists to gather and reflect on the role of sound in their lives and practices.

Archive House 

The Archive House is a transformed building that houses a micro library. Gates acquired the building that is now the Archive House in 2009 for $16,000. The Archive House is one of Gates' projects within Dorchester Industries. Similar to Gates' other rehabilitation projects, the Archive House incorporates many reclaimed materials.

Listening House 

The Listening House is a renovated South Side candy store that provides space for community programs and serves as an archive for Chicago institutions of older eras. This includes Dr. Wax Records and 8,000 LPs comprising the final inventory from a former nearby record store. The rest of the house will be converted into areas for reading and other library-style purposes.

References

External links 

 
 Dorchester Art + Housing Collaborative
 The Black Cinema House

2010 establishments in Illinois
Non-profit organizations based in Chicago
South Side, Chicago
501(c)(3) organizations